Crassicrus is a genus of Central and South American tarantulas that was first described by S. B. Reichling & R. C. West in 1996.

Species
 it contains six species, found in Belize, Guatemala, and Mexico:
Crassicrus bidxigui Candia-Ramírez & Francke, 2017 – Mexico
Crassicrus cocona Candia-Ramírez & Francke, 2017 – Mexico
Crassicrus lamanai Reichling & West, 1996 (type) – Guatemala, Belize
Crassicrus stoicum (Chamberlin, 1925) – Mexico
Crassicrus tochtli Candia-Ramírez & Francke, 2017 – Mexico
Crassicrus yumkimil Candia-Ramírez & Francke, 2017 – Mexico

See also
 List of Theraphosidae species

References

Theraphosidae genera
Spiders of Central America
Spiders of Mexico
Theraphosidae
Taxa named by Rick C. West